The Seidewitz  is a river of Saxony, Germany. It is a left tributary of the Gottleuba, into which it flows in the town Pirna. Its source is in the Eastern Ore Mountains, near the village Breitenau. It flows through the town Liebstadt.

See also
List of rivers of Saxony

Rivers of Saxony
Rivers of Germany